Entodontaceae is a family of mosses belonging to the order Hypnales.

Genera
As accepted by GBIF:

The figures in parenthesis denote how many species in each genus.

References

Hypnales
Moss families